The 2022 Arizona Wildcats football team represented the University of Arizona during the 2022 NCAA Division I FBS football season. They were led by second-year head coach Jedd Fisch, and played their home games at Arizona Stadium in Tucson, Arizona. It was the Wildcats' 123rd season overall and 44th as a member of the Pac-12 Conference. The Wildcats finished 5–7 overall (3–6 in conference play) and failed to qualify for a bowl game.

Previous season

Offseason

Position key

Team departures
Over the course of the off-season, Arizona lost 48 total players. 18 players graduated, while the other 28 entered the transfer portal.

Coaching staff departures
During the off-season, Arizona lost 2 position coaches and 1 support staff members. The two position coaches that departed the team were defensive coordinator Don Brown and linebackers coach Keith Dudzinski. Brown took an upgrade by becoming the 30th head coach to return at UMass, while Dudzinski was return to became the defensive coordinator at UMass. Furthermore, Brown and Dudzinski were the final 2 coaches that were under current head coach Jedd Fisch.

Outgoing transfers
Twenty-four players elected to enter the NCAA Transfer Portal during or after the 2021 season.

†  
Note: Players with a dash in the new school column didn't land on a new team for the 2022 season.

Acquisitions

Incoming transfers
Over the off-season, Arizona added nine players from the transfer portal. According to 247 Sports, Arizona had the 27th ranked transfer class in the country. The first transfer was quarterback Jayden de Laura. de Laura transferred from Washington State. On the offensive side, Arizona also added Florida State running back D.J. Williams, UTEP wide receiver Jacob Cowing and New Mexico offensive lineman Jack Buford. However, Arizona only took 5 defensive transfers in UCLA defensive back DJ Warnell and UCLA defensive lineman Tiaoalii Savea, Michigan linebacker Anthony Solomon, USC Trojans linebacker Hunter Echols and Utah linebacker Jeremy Mercier.

2022 recruiting class

Arizona signed 25 players in the class of 2022. The Wildcats' recruiting class ranks 19th in the nation for 247Sports and 22nd in Rivals rankings. Four signees were ranked in the ESPN 300 top prospect list. Arizona also signed walk-ons during national signing day period.

 

 

 
 
 
 

 
 
 

*= 247Sports Composite rating; ratings are out of 1.00. (five stars= 1.00–.98, four stars= .97–.90, three stars= .80–.89, two stars= .79–.70, no stars= <70)
†= Despite being rated as a four and five star recruit by ESPN, On3.com, Rivals.com and 247Sports.com, McMillan received a four star 247Sports Composite rating.
Δ= Left the Arizona program following signing but prior to the 2022 season.

2022 overall class rankings

Walk-ons

2023 recruiting class

 

 
 
 

 

 
 

 

  

2023 overall class rankings

Coaching staff additions

Returning starters

Offense

Defense

Special teams

† Indicates player was a starter in 2021 but missed all of 2022 due to injury.

Preseason

Spring game
The 2022 Wildcats spring game is tentatively scheduled to take place in Tucson, Arizona on April 9, 2022. The Wildcats were scheduled to hold spring practices on March 2 to April 7, 2022.

Award watch lists
Listed in the order that they were released

Pac-12 Media Day
The Pac-12 Media Day was held on July 29, 2022 at the Novo Theater, LA Live (Pac-12 Network) with Jedd Fisch (HC), Jacob Cowing (WR) and Christian Young (DB). The preseason polls will be released on July 28, 2022. Arizona was picked to finish 11th in the annual Pac-12 football media poll released by the league Thursday.

Preseason All-Pac-12 and All-American honors
First Team

Second Team

 

Source:

Roster

Depth chart

True Freshman

Injury report

Schedule
The Wildcats' 2022 schedule consists of seven home and five away games for the regular season. Arizona will play against three non-conference opponents from the Mountain West, SEC, and Missouri Valley Football conferences to begin the season.

The Wildcats will face San Diego State (Mountain West) on the road and Mississippi State (SEC) and North Dakota State (Missouri Valley Football) at home. The Wildcats are scheduled to host Colorado, Oregon, USC, Washington State and archrival Arizona State for the 96th annual Territorial Cup to close out the Pac-12 regular season at home. They are scheduled to travel to California, UCLA, Utah, and Washington. Arizona is not scheduled to play Pac-12 opponents Oregon State and Stanford this season.

Game summaries

at San Diego State

Mississippi State

No. 1 (FCS) North Dakota State

at California

Colorado

No. 12 Oregon

at Washington

No. 10 USC

at No. 14 Utah

at No. 12 UCLA

Washington State

Arizona State

Rankings

Statistics

Team

Individual Leaders

Offense

Defense

Key: POS: Position, SOLO: Solo Tackles, AST: Assisted Tackles, TOT: Total Tackles, TFL: Tackles-for-loss, SACK: Quarterback Sacks, INT: Interceptions, BU: Passes Broken Up, PD: Passes Defended, QBH: Quarterback Hits, FR: Fumbles Recovered, FF: Forced Fumbles, BLK: Kicks or Punts Blocked, SAF: Safeties, TD : Touchdown

Special teams

Scoring

Arizona vs Non-Conference Opponents

Arizona vs Pac-12 Opponents

Arizona vs All Opponents

After the season

Awards and honors

Sources:

Individual National Awards

All-Americans

Bowl games

All Star games

NFL draft

The NFL Draft will be held at Arrowhead Stadium in Kansas City, MO on April 27–29, 2023.

Wildcats who were picked in the 2023 NFL Draft:

NFL Draft combine
No members of the 2022 team were invited to participate in drills at the 2023 NFL scouting Combine.

† Top performer

DNP = Did not participate

Media coverage

Radio
ESPN Radio – (ESPN Tucson 1490 AM & 104.09 FM) – Nationwide (Dish Network, Sirius XM, TuneIn radio and iHeartRadio)
KCUB 1290 AM – Football Radio Show – (Tucson, AZ)
KHYT – 107.5 FM (Tucson, AZ)
KTKT 990 AM – La Hora de Los Gatos (Spanish) – (Tucson, AZ)
KGME 910 AM – (IMG Sports Network) – (Phoenix, AZ)
KTAN 1420 AM – (Sierra Vista, AZ)
KDAP 96.5 FM (Douglas, Arizona)
KWRQ 102.3 FM – (Safford, AZ/Thatcher, AZ)
KIKO 1340 AM – (Globe, AZ)
KVWM 970 AM – (Show Low, AZ/Pinetop-Lakeside, AZ)
XENY 760 – (Nogales, Sonora) (Spanish)
KTZR (1450 AM) - (FoxSports 1450) - (Tucson, AZ)

TV
CBS Family – KOLD (CBS), CBSN 
ABC/ESPN Family – KGUN (ABC), ABC, ESPN, ESPN2, ESPNU, ESPN+, 
FOX Family – KMSB (FOX), FOX/FS1, FSN 
Pac-12 Network (Pac-12 Arizona)
NBC – KVOA, NBC Sports, NBCSN

TV ratings

All totals via Sports Media Watch. Streaming numbers not included. † - Data not available.

See also
2022–23 Arizona Wildcats men's basketball team
2022–23 Arizona Wildcats women's basketball team

References

Arizona
Arizona Wildcats football seasons
Arizona Football